Xanthodonta nigrovittata is a moth of the family Notodontidae. It is found in Kenya.

The wingspan is 23–31 mm.

References

Images of the type: Swedish Museum of Natural History

Endemic moths of Kenya
Notodontidae
Moths described in 1921